Traveller was launched at Hull in 1786. She traded between Hull and the Baltic until 1798 or so, when she began maiking annual voyages as a Greenlandman, that is, as a whaler in the northern whale fishery. She was captured in 1808 during the Gunboat War while trading with the Baltic between annual whaling voyages.

Career
Traveller first entered and Lloyd's Register (LR) in 1786.

From at least 1798 on Traveller engaged in whale hunting in the northern whale fishery.

The whaling season generally ran from March-April to September-October. Between whaling voyages, Traveller sailed to the Baltic. Lloyd's List reported in January 1806 that Traveller, Foster, master, had arrived at Hull having sailed from Riga via the Elbe, where she had joined a convoy under escort by the armed ship .

Fate
Lloyd's List reported in January 1808 that Traveller, Foster, master, had put into Carlsham to join a convoy. Lloyd's List reported in February that Ann, Harrison, master, and Traveller, Foster, master, from Stockholm, were captured and taken into Bornholm.

Citations

1786 ships
Age of Sail merchant ships of England
Whaling ships
Captured ships